Vinicius Guirra Miller de Oliveira (born 23 November 1990), commonly known as Vinicius Miller or simply Miller, is a Brazilian professional footballer who currently plays for Bangu.

Career statistics

Club

Notes

References

1990 births
Living people
Brazilian footballers
Brazilian expatriate footballers
Association football midfielders
Botafogo de Futebol e Regatas players
Boavista Sport Club players
Ceres Futebol Clube players
Agremiação Sportiva Arapiraquense players
Bonsucesso Futebol Clube players
Macaé Esporte Futebol Clube players
Yangon United F.C. players
Brazilian expatriate sportspeople in Myanmar
Expatriate footballers in Myanmar
Footballers from Rio de Janeiro (city)